8K or 8k may stand for:
8K resolution
 8K UHDTV, a digital video format
 8 K, the quantity 8 kelvins
8000 (number), a natural number
Form 8-K, a United States Securities and Exchange Commission form
 8,000 metres or 8K, a common running race distance
Eight-thousander, a class of tall mountains
GCR Class 8K, a class of British 2-8-0 steam locomotive
China Railways 8K, an Alstom-built electric locomotive
K-Mile Air (IATA airline code)

See also
K8 (disambiguation)

it:8K